Churchgate (station code: CCG) is the southern terminus on the Western Line of the Mumbai Suburban Railway. It is located in Churchgate in South Mumbai, Maharashtra.

History

Early history

The Fort area built by the British had three main gates. One of these gates led straight to Saint Thomas Cathedral Church, hence it was named "Church Gate". This gate was demolished in 1860. Later the Churchgate railway station was built in 1870 in close proximity to the position of the demolished gate.

Churchgate station is a terminus of Western Railway line of Mumbai suburban railway. It is the southernmost station of the city, though up to the 1931, Colaba was the southernmost station, however the rail line was removed beyond Churchgate, making Churchgate the southernmost station.

The Bombay, Baroda and Central India Railway (present Western Railway) was inaugurated in 1855 with the construction of rail line (BG) between Ankleshwar and Uttaran (a distance of 29 miles).
In 1859 this line was further extended on the west coast up to Bombay. By 1867, a track along the foreshore, further than Grant Road station was constructed, up to the station named as "Bombay Backbay" near Marine Lines.
On 12 April 1867, the first suburban train was started with one train each way from Virar to Bombay Back Bay.
The stations were then named, "Viraur, Neela, Bassein, Panje, Borewla, Pahadee, Andaru, Santa Cruz, Bandora, Mahim, Dadur, Grant Road and Bombay Backbay".

In year 1870, Churchgate was first time mentioned as the station.
The line further extended towards Colaba in 1872, and goods shed was built there.
In year 1896, a brand new station was established at Colaba to serve as terminus for both passenger and suburban lines.
The Government of Bombay issued order to the railway to hand over the section of rail line between Churchgate and Colaba.
Therefore, Bombay Central (Mumbai Central), a new station was constructed near Bellasis Bridge, which was opened on 18 December 1930.
From the midnight of 31 December, Colaba, ceased to be a terminus.

Current history

Presently, this station is home to the Western Railway headquarters. The older Western Railway headquarters is across the road. Today, the station is one of the busiest stations in the city. Trains arrive and depart every minute with clockwork precision. Millions of city dwellers residing in the suburbs alight at this station to get to their offices in the business districts of south Mumbai. The total cost of reconstruction of Churchgate Station was INR 12.8 million approximately, which includes remodelling of the yard, construction of platforms, station premises and offices

The station is the terminus for local trains on Western Railways. The earliest train departs at 4:15 for Virar, and the last train at 1:00 towards Borivali.

Till 2010, the station had platforms which could accommodate 9 and 12 coach trains. But with the introduction of 15-coach trains there was a need to extend the length of the platform. Hence in Dec 2010 work began on extension of the platforms to accommodate the 15-coach trains.

On 28 June 2015 a train derailed after crashing into the end of the platform after not stopping in time. Five people were injured.

References

External links

 Video Tour of Churchgate Station Terminus

Mumbai WR railway division
Railway stations in Mumbai City district
Mumbai Suburban Railway stations
Railway stations opened in 1855
1855 establishments in India
Railway stations in India opened in the 1850s